William M. Connolly (born March 31, 1938) is a former justice of the Nebraska Supreme Court, appointed by Governor Ben Nelson in 1994. He attended Creighton University for both his undergraduate studies and his law degree. He is also a graduate of Creighton Preparatory School, class of 1956. He worked as the County Attorney of Adams County from 1967 to 1972, and was a Nebraska State Court of Appeals judge from 1992 to 1994. He has four children and six grandchildren.

See also 

 Nebraska Supreme Court
 Nebraska State Court of Appeals

References

Sources
 

1938 births
Living people
Creighton University alumni
Creighton University School of Law alumni
Lawyers from Omaha, Nebraska
Nebraska state court judges
Justices of the Nebraska Supreme Court
Politicians from Omaha, Nebraska